Żubrówka Bison Grass Vodka is a flavored Polish vodka, which contains a bison grass blade (Hierochloe odorata) in every bottle. The Żubrówka brand name is also used on bottles of conventional vodka, labeled as Żubrówka Biała. An easy way to tell the difference is to look for the blade of grass in the bottle. The grass is sourced from the Białowieża Forest, hand-picked and dried under natural conditions.

Żubrówka ranks as the third or fourth best-selling vodka brand in the world (after Smirnoff, Absolut, and occasionally Khortytsia). Żubrówka is available in more than 80 markets worldwide.

Żubrówka is manufactured at the Polmos Białystok distillery. While it is claimed that the recipe dates back as far as the 14th century, commercial production of Bison Grass Vodka first began at the distillery in 1928. The brand is owned by Central European Distribution Corporation International, which was acquired by Roust International in 2013. Since 2022, it has been owned by the Maspex Group.

Etymology and brand 
In Polish, the word  is officially used for bison grass, while the name żubrówka has been used in folk terminology and colloquially. The name comes from the term zubr, the word for the European bison in many Slavic languages and Baltic languages.

The brands Zubrovka and Żubrówka are registered by Sojuzplodoimport in Russia and Roust International in Poland.

United States variant 
Before 2010 Żubrówka was illegal in the United States because the grass it is made from contains coumarin which the FDA classifies as a "substances generally prohibited from direct addition or use as human food". Since 2011 the manufacturers have made a version of Żubrówka from rye grain which aims to have a flavor similar to the original.

Methods of consumption 
Żubrówka Bison Grass Vodka is usually served chilled on its own. An alternative is mixing it with apple juice, a drink known in Polish as tatanka or szarlotka (Polish for "apple cake"); known in the UK as a Frisky Bison, and in the US as a Polish Kiss. It is sometimes served over vanilla ice cream, and another common mixer is ginger ale. A Black Bison is żubrówka mixed with blackcurrant juice. A Żubrate is mixed with a mate based lemonade, such as Club Mate.

In popular culture 

Żubrówka is mentioned in Moscow-Petushki, a pseudo-autobiographical postmodernist prose poem by Russian writer and satirist Venedikt Yerofeyev.
 In a letter dated July 31, 1892, Anton Chekhov writes to Natalia Lintvaryova: "To begin with, thanks for the Żubrówka. I drank five shots of it one after the other and found it does wonders for cholera."
The bison emblem ("roaring bull") of Fighter Squadron 11, Lapland Air Command, Finnish Air Force, originated from the label of Polmos Żubrówka. It was introduced in 1941 as the emblem of PLeLv 46, on its Dornier 17 bombers, and later adopted by Fighter Squadron 11. Pilots of PLeLv 46 had seen the Żubrówka label while picking up Do 17 bombers from Warsaw.
Żubrówka appears in a song J'ai Cru Entendre featured in Christophe Honoré's 2007 musical film Love Songs.
Żubrówka figures prominently in the 2000 movie Suzhou River.
Żubrówka is featured in W. Somerset Maugham's 1944 novel The Razor's Edge (and in the 1984 film adaptation).
The name of the country Żubrówka in the 2014 movie The Grand Budapest Hotel is named after this style of vodka.
Navy SEAL Chris Kyle mentions it in his 2012 book American Sniper while working with the Polish GROM.

See also
List of vodkas
Flavoured liquor

References

External links 

Roust International  Official site
CEDC Official Site
 Zubrowka at Facebook
 Zubrowka: Polish Vodka and Cultural Geographic Indicators

Luxury brands
Polish vodkas
Polish brands
Rye-based drinks